Ab Bid-e Sar Anjeli (also Romanized as Āb Bīd-e Sar Ānjelī; also known as Cheshmeh Sarānjīlī, Sarānjīlī, and Sar Anjīlī) is a village in Komehr Rural District, in the Central District of Sepidan County, Fars Province, Iran. At the 2006 census, its population was 86, in 20 families.

References 

Populated places in Sepidan County